Gagandeep Singh (born 3 October 1981 in Ludhiana, Punjab) is an Indian cricketer.  He played for Punjab, and Kings XI Punjab in the Indian Premier League.  Over a ten-year career, from 1999–00 to 2009–10, he took 266 wickets at an average of 20.84, with 16 five wicket hauls, and three times took ten wickets in a match. He was part of the India squad for a Test series against Bangladesh in 2004, but did not make the final team for any matches.

References 

Indian cricketers
Punjab, India cricketers
1981 births
Living people
People from Ludhiana
Punjab Kings cricketers